
Gmina Przemęt is a rural gmina (administrative district) in Wolsztyn County, Greater Poland Voivodeship, in west-central Poland.

The gmina contains part of the protected area called Przemęt Landscape Park.

Villages
Gmina Przemęt contains the villages and settlements of Barchlin, Biskupice, Błotnica, Borek, Bucz, Bucz Dębina, Bucz Nowy, Górsko, Kaszczor, Kluczewo, [Mochy], Nowa Wieś, Olejnica, Osłonin, Perkowo, Popowo Stare, Poświętno, Przemęt, Radomierz, Sączkowo, Siekówko, Siekowo, Sokołowice, Solec, Solec Nowy, Starkowo, Wieleń Zaobrzański and Wincentowo.

Neighbouring gminas
Gmina Przemęt is bordered by the gminas of Rakoniewice, Sława, Śmigiel, Wielichowo, Wijewo, Włoszakowice and Wolsztyn.

References

External links
 Polish official population figures 2006

Przemet
Wolsztyn County